Fort Logan was a military post south of downtown Denver, Colorado that operated from 1887 to 1946. Initially named Fort Sheridan, in 1889 the fort was named after Union General John A. Logan, commander of US Volunteer forces during the American Civil War.

History
Denver citizens were concerned about their safety due to the influx of settlers from the east. They petitioned the United States Army to build a post. Colorado Senator Henry M. Teller introduced a bill in Congress 1886 for construction of a post, which was signed on February 1887. The fort, originally known as "the camp near the city of Denver" first housed members of the 18th Infantry from Leavenworth, Kansas and Fort Hays. They established a temporary barracks and guardhouse while permanent buildings were constructed. Initially, the post responded to local civil and labor disputes. 

A three-acre cemetery was established in 1889. The first recorded burial was for Mable Peterkin, daughter of Private Peterkin, who died on June 28, 1889. It was named Fort Logan in August 1889 for General John A. Logan, who led Union Army volunteer forces during the Civil War. He was the head of the post-war organization Grand Army of the Republic and issued General Orders No. 11, establishing May 30 as "Decoration Day", now called Memorial Day, to honor the Civil War dead. In 1889, the town of Fort Logan was established that included the base and surrounding land. 

During the Spanish–American War, it mobilized troops with Camp Adams, a temporary organization. In 1908, 340 acres of land were added to the fort, and the following year it was reduced to a recruiting post. It was the only major military post in Colorado during World War I. It continued to operate as a recruiting post until 1922 when the 38th Infantry was garrisoned at the post. The fort was closed in May 1946.

Aftermath
When the post was no longer required, some of the land was used for creation of the Fort Logan National Cemetery in 1949. A Queen Anne style officer's quarters building was made into a museum. Most of the land was donated in 1960 to the state of Colorado was used for the Fort Logan Mental Health Center.

References

Further reading
 

1887 establishments in Colorado
Forts in Colorado